TVR Craiova is one of the six regional branches of Societatea Română de Televiziune (Romanian Television). It was established on May 16, 1996, and began broadcasting on December 1, 1998, with a live transmission from the Mihai Viteazul Square in Craiova.

References

External links
 TVR

Craiova
Mass media in Craiova
Television channels and stations established in 1996
Television stations in Romania